Scott Mitchell Baker (April 30, 1957 – June 23, 2000) was a racecar driver on the ARCA circuit.

Baker was born in Chicago, Illinois in 1957 and graduated from Saugatuck High School in Saugatuck, Michigan in 1975. He served in the United States Navy for six years prior to his race-driving career.

Baker died on June 23, 2000 after a crash in the Jasper Engines & Transmissions 150, an ARCA race at Toledo Speedway in Toledo, Ohio. Late in the race, Baker was running in the 8th position when he made contact with Joe Cooksey which spun Baker into a tire barrier made of tractor tires. The seriousness of the crash caused the race to be called at 149 laps completed of the scheduled 150 with Frank Kimmel being declared the winner, and Scott placed in the 16th position. The impact caused his head and neck restraint to strain the arteries carrying oxygen to his brain, causing his death.

References

External links
 Baker's obituary
 

1957 births
2000 deaths
ARCA Menards Series drivers
People from Holland, Michigan
Racing drivers from Michigan
Racing drivers who died while racing
Filmed deaths in motorsport
Sports deaths in Ohio